Samuel Phillips may refer to:
Samuel Phillips, Jr. (1752–1802), Massachusetts politician
Samuel Phillips (journalist) (1814–1854), English journalist
Samuel Phillips (minister) (1690–1771), colonial American minister
Samuel C. Phillips (1921–1990), U.S. Air Force general
Samuel D. Phillips (1845–1915), U.S. Army, Medal of Honor recipient
Samuel F. Phillips (1824–1903), U.S. solicitor general, 1872–1885
Samuel James Phillips (1855–1920), Australian politician and pastoralist
Samuel Pole Phillips (1819–1901), Australian politician and pastoralist

See also 
Sam Phillips (disambiguation)